Glencoe (formerly, Mosquito and Mosquito Gulch) is an unincorporated community in Calaveras County, California. The community's ZIP code is 95232.

Glencoe was formerly called Mosquito Gulch. The business portion of the town was on the north side of Mosquito Gulch, but not one of the old buildings remains. The mines were first worked by Mexicans in the early 1850s. Quartz mining predominated but there was some placer mining as well.

The town today is registered as California Historical Landmark #280.

The first post office was opened at Mosquito in 1858 but closed in 1869; it was re-established as Mosquito Gulch in 1873. The name was changed to Glencoe in 1912; the post office closed again in 1916, but was re-established in 1947.

Politics

References

External links

Unincorporated communities in California
Unincorporated communities in Calaveras County, California
California Historical Landmarks